The League of Gentlemen (1958) is a pulp-fiction novel by English author John Boland. The novel was made into the film The League of Gentlemen, which was released in 1960 and became the year's most successful British film.

Plot summary

Lt. Col. Hyde is forced into early retirement after 25 years of service as an officer in the British Army. To get his revenge, Hyde recruits seven other former officers for a special project. They are all in bad standing with the Army—having been forced out for quite serious indiscretions—and are equally dissatisfied and have skeletons in their closets.

The job Hyde is planning turns out to be a bank robbery. Hyde has chosen the officers for their respective specialties, qualities that Hyde needs to succeed with the robbery. Before robbing the bank itself, however, they stage a number of raids to get the weapons and trucks they need, and all goes off without a hitch. Hyde uses all of his skills and discipline as a tactical military strategist to execute the plan. The robbery is organised with military precision and everything really seems to go as planned—except for one simple error that gives them all away.

Sequels
Boland wrote two sequels to The League of Gentlemen, The Gentlemen Reform and The Gentlemen at Large, which were published in 1961 and 1962 respectively by T. V. Boardman & Co.

1958 British novels
British novels adapted into films